The 1943 Ontario general election was held on August 4, 1943, to elect the 90 Members of the 21st Legislative Assembly of Ontario (Members of Provincial Parliament, or "MPPs") of the Province of Ontario.

The Ontario Progressive Conservative Party, led by George Drew, defeated the Ontario Liberal Party government. The Liberal government had disintegrated over the previous two years because of a conflict between Mitchell Hepburn, the Ontario caucus and the federal Liberal Party of Canada.

Hepburn resigned and was eventually succeeded by Harry Nixon in early 1943. The change in leadership was not enough to save the government. The election held later that year resulted in the Conservative Party, recently renamed the "Progressive Conservative Party", winning a minority government. This began forty-two uninterrupted years of government by the Tories who combined moderate progressive policies with pragmatism and caution.

The Liberals fell to third place behind a new force, the socialist Ontario Co-operative Commonwealth Federation (CCF), led by Ted Jolliffe, went from obscurity to form the Official Opposition, winning 32% of the vote and 34 seats in the legislature, just four short of Drew's Tories. The Liberals and their Liberal-Progressive allies fell from 66 seats to a mere 15.

Two members of the banned Communist Party of Ontario running as "Labour" candidates won seats in the Legislature for the first time in this election: A.A. MacLeod  in the Toronto riding of Bellwoods, and J.B. Salsberg in the Toronto riding of St. Andrews. Several days following the election the Labor-Progressive Party was officially formed and Salsberg and MacLeod agreed to sit in the legislature as the party's representatives.

Results

Seats that changed hands

There were 58 seats that changed allegiance in the election.

 PC to CCF
Fort William
Riverdale
Woodbine
York East
York South

 Liberal to PC
Durham
Eglinton
Essex South
Haldimand—Norfolk
Halton
Huron
Huron—Bruce
Lincoln
London
Middlesex North
Middlesex South
Northumberland
Oxford
Peterborough
Renfrew North
Simcoe Centre
St. George
St. Patrick
Stormont

 Liberal to CCF
Bracondale
Cochrane North
Cochrane South
Essex North
Hamilton Centre
Hamilton East
Hamilton—Wentworth
Kenora
Lambton West
Niagara Falls
Nipissing
Ontario
Parry Sound
Port Arthur
Rainy River
Sault Ste. Marie
St. David
Sudbury
Timiskaming
Waterloo North
Waterloo South
Welland
Wellington South
Wentworth
Windsor—Sandwich
Windsor—Walkerville
York North
York West

 Liberal to Labor-Progressive
Bellwoods
St. Andrew

 Liberal to Independent-Liberal
Elgin

 Independent-Liberal to CCF
 Brantford

 Liberal-Progressive to PC
Kent East

 Liberal-Progressive to Liberal
Grey North

 UFO to Liberal
Grey South

References

See also
Politics of Ontario
List of Ontario political parties
Premier of Ontario
Leader of the Opposition (Ontario)

1943 elections in Canada
1943
August 1943 events
November 1943 events